Oedostethus is a genus of beetles belonging to the family Elateridae.

The species of this genus are found in Europe, Japan and Northern America.

Species:
 Oedostethus cryptohypnoidus (Miwa, 1930)

References

Elateridae
Elateridae genera